The 2019–20 DePaul Blue Demons men's basketball team represented DePaul University during the 2019–20 NCAA Division I men's basketball season. They were led by fifth-year (eighth overall with DePaul) head coach Dave Leitao and played their home games at Wintrust Arena in Chicago as members of the Big East Conference. The Demons finished the season 16–16, 3–15 in Big East play to finish in last place. They defeated Xavier in the first round of the Big East tournament before the remaining tournament was canceled due to the ongoing COVID-19 pandemic.

Previous season
The Blue Demons finished the 2018–19 season 19–17, 7–11 in Big East play to finish in a three-way tie for last place. As the No. 10 seed in the Big East tournament, they lost in the first round to St. John's. They received a bid to the College Basketball Invitational where they defeated Central Michigan, Longwood, and Coastal Carolina to advance to the championship series against South Florida. There, in a best-of-three series, they lost to South Florida two games to one.

Offseason

Departures

Incoming transfers

2019 recruiting class

Roster

Schedule and results

|-
!colspan=9 style=| Exhibition

|-
!colspan=9 style=|Non-conference regular season

|-
!colspan=9 style=| Big East regular season

|-
!colspan=9 style=| Big East tournament

|-
!colspan=9 style=|Canceled
|-

Source:

Ranking

*AP does not release post-NCAA Tournament rankings

References

DePaul Blue Demons men's basketball seasons
DePaul
DePaul
DePaul